Marion Earl Cooper (born September 17, 1957) is a former professional American football player who was selected by the San Francisco 49ers in the 1st round (13th overall) of the 1980 NFL Draft.

Career 
A 6'2", 227-lb. fullback-tight end from Rice University, Cooper played in 7 NFL seasons from 1980 to 1986. During his rookie season for the 49ers in 1980, he finished second in the league in receptions with 83 (San Diego's Kellen Winslow had 89). He was a key contributor on the final 89-yard drive that led to the play that has been immortalized as "The Catch" in the 1982 NFC Playoffs versus the Dallas Cowboys.

Cooper also appeared in two Super Bowls for the 49ers, even catching an 11-yard touchdown pass from quarterback Joe Montana in Super Bowl XVI versus the Cincinnati Bengals, a catch beautifully depicted on the cover of Sports Illustrated. He ended his career with the Los Angeles Raiders in 1986.

Personal life 
Cooper graduated from high school in Lexington, Texas. He was a teacher and coach in Pflugerville, Texas, but is now retired.

References

1957 births
Living people
American football fullbacks
American football tight ends
Los Angeles Raiders players
Rice Owls football players
San Francisco 49ers players
People from Giddings, Texas
Players of American football from Texas